Kaponga is a small town in the southern part of the Taranaki region of New Zealand. It is known as "The Gateway to Dawson's Falls" on Mount Taranaki. Auroa lies to the south-east.

History
The small town of Kaponga was settled in 1882, and has strong Swiss connections. Some of the first settlers in the area were Swiss, and in 1952, the Taranaki Swiss Club was formed.

The town was once a much larger town than it is today: with many stores. There are only a few shops now, including a  Fish n Chip Shop, the 4 Square (supermarket), a bed-and-breakfast (Constable Cottage), veterinary services (Coastal Veterinary Services Ltd), Farm Source (another rural supply business), and the Kaponga Hotel (bar). A recent addition to Kaponga is The Green Door, a music shop featuring an extensive collection of records, compact discs and collectables for sale. It is also home to a garden of national significance, Hollard Gardens.

There are many other businesses working in and around the village, mainly relying on the booming dairy industry. The Kaponga and surrounding community has a South Taranaki District Council LibraryPlus, which provides a full library service and Council related services. These services include being able to register your dog, pay your rates or inquire about obtaining a building permit. The LibraryPlus also has two APN computers, offering free internet and Skype to the public.

Demographics

The population of Kaponga was 312 in the 2018 New Zealand census, an increase of 18 (6.1%) since the 2013 census, and a decrease of 48 (-13.3%) since the 2006 census. There were 171 males and 144 females, giving a sex ratio of 1.19 males per female. Ethnicities were 249 people  (79.8%) European/Pākehā, 90 (28.8%) Māori, 18 (5.8%) Pacific peoples, and 9 (2.9%) Asian (totals add to more than 100% since people could identify with multiple ethnicities). Of the total population, 66 people  (21.2%) were under 15 years old, 54 (17.3%) were 15–29, 159 (51.0%) were 30–64, and 33 (10.6%) were over 65.

Kaponga-Mangatoki

Kaponga-Mangatoki had a population of 1,305 at the 2018 New Zealand census, an increase of 24 people (1.9%) since the 2013 census, and a decrease of 66 people (-4.8%) since the 2006 census. There were 471 households. There were 699 males and 609 females, giving a sex ratio of 1.15 males per female. The median age was 34.1 years (compared with 37.4 years nationally), with 336 people (25.7%) aged under 15 years, 240 (18.4%) aged 15 to 29, 618 (47.4%) aged 30 to 64, and 111 (8.5%) aged 65 or older.

Ethnicities were 88.5% European/Pākehā, 14.0% Māori, 2.3% Pacific peoples, 4.6% Asian, and 1.8% other ethnicities (totals add to more than 100% since people could identify with multiple ethnicities).

The proportion of people born overseas was 9.2%, compared with 27.1% nationally.

Although some people objected to giving their religion, 51.7% had no religion, 35.4% were Christian, 0.5% were Buddhist and 1.6% had other religions.

Of those at least 15 years old, 87 (9.0%) people had a bachelor or higher degree, and 270 (27.9%) people had no formal qualifications. The median income was $31,700, compared with $31,800 nationally. The employment status of those at least 15 was that 531 (54.8%) people were employed full-time, 141 (14.6%) were part-time, and 27 (2.8%) were unemployed.

Education
Kaponga School is a school with a roll of  students. The school was founded in 1891. In 2005, Kapuni and Mahoe schools closed and merged into Kaponga School.

St Patrick's School is a state integrated Catholic school with a roll of  students. St Patrick's started in 1921 with lessons held in the local church. It moved into its own building in February 1922.

Both are coeducational full primary schools, covering years 1-8. Rolls are as of

Association Football

The Kaponga Soccer Club was formed in 1906 and is one of the oldest football clubs in Taranaki. The club has won the Taranaki Championship three times, in 1909 1912 and 1924. In 1926 the club won the Manaia Hibernian Society 7-a-side cup before disbanding for a time. A new club emerged in the area under the name Egmont United in 1929, made from Kaponga, Auroa, Eltham and Stratford players before dissolving in 1931.

References

External links
 St Patrick's School website
 Kaponga Primary School website
 Hollard Gardens website
 Constable Cottage 
 Mt Taranaki Adventures 
 Taranaki Swiss Club 
 Settler Kaponga by R. Arnold, eText
 Photo of a Kaponga settler's home, 1900 (from Arnold)
 Photo of a wagon in Kaponga c1911 (from Arnold)

Populated places in Taranaki
South Taranaki District